Olga Rotari (born on July 25, 1989) is a Moldovan classical pianist and chamber musician.

Biography 

Rotari began to play the piano at the age of six-years old. Initially started her piano studies with the musician Natalia Dimcha “наталья димча” and at the age of 15, she enrolled at Anton Rubinstein Music Academy in Tiraspol, Moldova. In pursuit of higher studies, she moved to Turkey. Continued at Istanbul University State Conservatory under the mentoring of Prof. Cana Gurmen. In 2012, she graduated with the degree of baccalaureate of Music in Piano Performance. She attended masterclasses and by year of 2017, she received the Master of Music in Piano Performance after publishing a thesis titled: "Examination of Piano transcriptions and paraphrases written by Franz Liszt on Opera".

In 2020, she joined the ranks of famous musicians as such Simon Rattle, Judith Weir, John McCabe as a member of the Incorporated Society of Musicians the UK's professional body for musicians and subject association for music.

Rotari is not only known as a solo classical pianist, but also as chamber musician. and duet performance in cooperation with other artists such as Tutu Aydınoğlu.

Competition and awards 

She rose to prominence after winning the 16th International Young Musicians Chamber Music Competition at Edirne Mimar Sinan Rotary Club Chamber followed by winning three major competitions in 2016: Heirs of Orpheus in Bulgaria, Stars at Tenerife in Spain and Musical Fireworks in Baden-Württemberg – Germany. And in 2018, she won the Musical Fireworks in Baden-Württemberg - Germany 2018.

Solo and chamber performances 
 Galatasaray Üniversitesi -Istanbul, Turkey
 Istanbul University State Conservatory – Istanbul, Turkey
 Sweden , General Consulate of Japan - Istanbul, Turkey
 Notre Dame de Sion -Istanbul, Turkey
 Medica Culture Center -Istanbul, Turkey
 Zorlu PSM – Istanbul, Turkey
 Yeldeğirmeni Culture and Art Center - Istanbul, Turkey
 Caddebostan Culture and Art Center Main Hall - Istanbul, Turkey
 Süreyya Opera Hall - Istanbul, Turkey
 Galatasaray University – Istanbul, Turkey
 Istanbul University Congress and Culture Center - Istanbul, Turkey

Festival and events 
 Pera International Piano Festival -Beyoğlu, Turkey
 Antalya International Piano Festival -Antalya, Turkey
 Edirne Mimar Sinan Rotary Young Musicians Chamber Performance - Edirne, Turkey
 Bayerische Musikakademie - Marktoberdorf, Germany
 Istanbul International Chamber Choir May 11, 2011 in Istanbul, Turkey
 Intertemporal German Music Event at Caddebostan Cultural Center
 Piano Recital - Caddebostan Cultural Center Concert
 laureate of international competitions TV interview at ATV Channel

References

External links 
 Olga Rotari Official site
 International competition "Musical fireworks in Baden-Württemberg" in Germany
 Pera International Piano Festival
 Antalya International Piano Festival
 Bayerische Musikakademie

Women classical pianists
1989 births
Living people
21st-century classical pianists
20th-century classical pianists
Moldovan musicians
People from Comrat
20th-century women pianists
21st-century women pianists